Pierre Schoebel (born 26 June 1942) is a French former hurdler. He competed in the men's 110 metres hurdles at the 1968 Summer Olympics.

References

External links
 

1942 births
Living people
Athletes (track and field) at the 1968 Summer Olympics
French male hurdlers
Olympic athletes of France
Place of birth missing (living people)
Universiade bronze medalists for France
Universiade medalists in athletics (track and field)
20th-century French people
21st-century French people